Stadio Tre Fontane is a sports stadium located in Rome, Italy. It is the home ground of rugby union side Rugby Roma Olimpic, who play in the Super 10 competition. It currently has a capacity of 4,000, although there are plans to redevelop and expand the stadium.

The stadium is also used by A.S. Roma Women for Serie A games and A.S. Roma Primavera for the UEFA Youth League games.

References

Rugby union stadiums in Italy
Sports venues in Rome
Sports venues in Italy
Football venues in Italy